Nude Before a Mirror (originally known as Nu devant une cheminée) is a 1955 painting by Polish-French artist Balthus. 

The painting depicts a nude woman before a mirror, which is a typical subject for Balthus, a fact that caused controversy in his early career. This painting is also referred to as Nude in Front of a Mantel. 

It is part of the collection of The Metropolitan Museum of Art, and was donated to the museum by art collector and banker Robert Lehman in 1975.

References

1955 paintings
Nude art
Paintings in the collection of the Metropolitan Museum of Art
Mirrors in art